The Dukedom of Chandos  was a title that has been created twice in the Peerage of England. First created as a barony by Edward III in 1337, its second creation in 1554 was due to the Brydges family's service to Mary I during Wyatt's rebellion, when she also gave them Sudeley Castle. The barony was elevated to a dukedom in 1719, and it finally fell into abeyance in 1789, after 452 years.

History
A Robert de Chandos went to Ireland with King John in 1185. His son Roger in 1221 received licence to hold a fair at Fownhope in 1221. The son of this Roger, Robert de Chandos (d. 1302) participated in the Welsh expedition of Edward I. The son of Robert, Roger de Chandos, served in the Scottish wars of Edward II and received a knighthood. In 1321, he was sheriff of Herefordshire. He was succeeded by Thomas de Chandos.

Thomas was succeeded by his brother Roger de Chandos (Rogerus de Chaundos). Roger was made knight banneret by Edward III. It was this Roger who was summoned to parliament, and who was cited as Baron de Chandos between 1337 (11th year of Edward III) and 1355, counting as the first creation of the title. Roger was succeeded by his son Thomas, who was in turn succeeded by his son John. Neither of these were summoned to parliament, and are thus not named Baron Chandos explicitly, but counted as de jure 2nd and 3rd Barons Chandos, respectively. John, who defended Hereford Castle against Owain Glyndŵr in 1403, died without issue in 1428. The Chandos estates in Herefordshire passed to the surviving daughter of John's sister Elizabeth, wife of Nicholas Mattesden, and eventually to his great nephew Giles Brugge, de jure 4th Baron Chandos (son of Edward Brugge and Alice de Berkeley whose mother was Margaret de Chandos). He became father to Thomas Brugge, 5th Baron Chandos (d. 1493). Thomas' son, Giles Brugge, 6th Baron Chandos (d. 1511) held the office of High Sheriff of Gloucestershire for 1499.

The son of Giles Brugge, John Brydges (d. 1557), was summoned to parliament for Gloucestershire at some point before 1554. In 1554, he was given Sudeley Castle and created "Baron Chandos, of Sudeley in the county of Gloucester" by Queen Mary I, in the second creation of the title.

The three succeeding barons were all Members of Parliament and persons of some importance—particularly Grey, 5th Baron, and his elder son George, 6th Baron. George had six daughters but no sons, and after the death of his brother William in 1676 the barony came to a kinsman, Sir James Brydges, Bart., who was English ambassador to Istanbul from 1680 to 1685.

The eighth baron's eldest son, James Brydges (1674–1744), succeeded his father as ninth Baron Chandos in 1714. In the same year, he was created Earl of Carnarvon (second creation) and Duke of Chandos in 1719. Subsidiary titles included Marquess of Carnarvon (1719) and Viscount Wilton (1714). All of these titles were in the Peerage of Great Britain.

The 1st Duke built an exceptionally grand country house called Cannons that, though it was parodied in his lifetime, was a seat of great learning and culture: Handel was the resident composer from 1717 until 1719. Brydges' Cannons was demolished after his death, to pay the debts he incurred in the South Sea Bubble disaster, and by his son. It was replaced by a modest villa built by William Hallett, and Cannons is now occupied by North London Collegiate School whose archives contain some information on the duke, his second wife Cassandra Willoughby, and subsequent owners of Cannons. Author Jane Austen was descended from his sister Mary.

With the death of the third duke in 1789, the titles became extinct, and the barony became dormant. An attempt was made by Samuel Egerton Brydges to claim the barony, initially on behalf of his older brother Edward Tymewell Brydges and then on his own behalf. Litigation lasted from 1790 to 1803 before the claims were rejected, but Egerton Brydges continued to style himself per legem terrae Baron Chandos of Sudeley. It seems likely that not only was the claim groundless but that the evidence was forged.

List of title holders

Barons Chandos, first creation (1337)
The title is spelt 'Chaundos' in the Complete Peerage.
Roger de Chandos, 1st Baron Chandos (d. 1353) was probably 1st Lord Chandos.
Thomas Chandos, 2nd Baron Chandos (c. 1333–1375) (claimant)
John Chandos, 3rd Baron Chandos (c. 1349–1428) (claimant) (peerage abeyant 1428)
Giles Brugge, 4th Baron Chandos (1396–1467) (abeyance terminated 1458, on the death of his cousin)
Thomas Brugge, 5th Baron Chandos de jure (1427–30 January 1493)
Giles Brugge, 6th Baron Chandos (c. 1462–1 December 1511)

Most sources read that the title became extinct upon the death of the 1st Lord, although others, such as the Complete Peerage, include the further holders listed above. The presumed 2nd Lord Chandos was High Sheriff of Herefordshire for 1359, 1370 and 1372 and the presumed 3rd Lord Chandos served the same office for 1382.

Barons Chandos, second creation (1554)
John Brydges, 1st Baron Chandos (1492–1557) is sometimes listed as de jure 7th Lord Chandos of the 1337 creation Son of 6th Baron of the preceding creation.
Edmund Brydges, 2nd Baron Chandos (bef. 1522–1573) eldest son of the 1st Baron
Giles Brydges, 3rd Baron Chandos (1548–1594), elder son of the 2nd Baron, died without male issue
William Brydges, 4th Baron Chandos (c. 1552–1602), younger son of the 2nd Baron
Grey Brydges, 5th Baron Chandos (c. 1581–1621), only son of the 4th Baron
George Brydges, 6th Baron Chandos (1620–1655), elder son of the 5th Baron, died without male issue
William Brydges, 7th Baron Chandos (d. 1676), younger son of the 5th Baron, died without male issue
James Brydges, 8th Baron Chandos (1642–1714), great-great-grandson of the 1st Baron
James Brydges, 9th Baron Chandos (1673–1744; created Earl of Carnarvon in 1714 and Duke of Chandos in 1719)

Dukes of Chandos (1719)
James Brydges, 1st Duke of Chandos (1673–1744), eldest son of the 8th Baron
John Brydges, Marquess of Carnarvon (1703–1727), elder son of the 1st Duke, died without male issue
Henry Brydges, 2nd Duke of Chandos (1708–1771), younger son of the 1st Duke
James Brydges, 3rd Duke of Chandos (1731–1789), only son of the 2nd Duke, died without male issue. His titles, other than the Lordship of Kinloss, became extinct.
The 3rd Duke's son-in-law, the 2nd Marquess of Buckingham, was created Duke of Buckingham and Chandos in 1822.

See also
Duke of Buckingham and Chandos
Viscount Chandos

References

The Gentleman's Magazine 162 (1837) pp. 534–535.
www.cracroftspeerage.co.uk

External links
Cannons entry from The DiCamillo Companion to British & Irish Country Houses

Extinct dukedoms in the Peerage of Great Britain
1337 establishments in England
Noble titles created in 1719
Brydges/Brugge family